FictionBook is an open XML-based e-book format which originated and gained popularity in Russia. FictionBook files have the  filename extension. Some readers also support ZIP-compressed FictionBook files ( or )

The FictionBook format does not specify the appearance of a document; instead, it describes its structure. For example, there are special tags for epigraphs, verses and quotations. All ebook metadata, such as author name, title, and publisher are also present in the ebook file. This makes the format convenient for automatic processing, indexing, ebook collection management and allows automatic conversion into other formats.

Software and hardware support 

The format is supported by e-book readers such as FBReader, AlReader, Haali Reader, STDU Viewer, CoolReader, Fly Reader, Okular, Ectaco jetBooks, HedgehogReader, Documents for iOS, and some others. Firefox can read FictionBook by installing the FB2 Reader extension. Many hardware vendors support FictionBook in their firmware: BeBook One, BeBook Mini and BeBook Club in Europe (and other Hanlin V3 and V5 based devices), all PocketBook Readers, COOL-ER devices, Cybook Opus and Cybook Gen3, and ASUS Eee Reader DR900. Devices based on the Hanvon N516 design can read FictionBook if custom OpenInkpot firmware is installed; it is factory default for Azbooka 516. Amazon's Kindle, Barnes & Noble's Nook, and Sony devices do not support FictionBook directly.

Conversion to and from FictionBook2 files ( and ) is possible via the cross-platform ebook management software Calibre.  Conversion to and from FictionBook2 format is also available via Pandoc.

See also 
 List of e-book readers

References

External links
 FictionBook 2.0 Specification

XML-based standards
Open formats
Office document file formats
Ebooks